Robert Roy Coats (1910–1995) was an American geologist known for his studies of the Aleutian Islands and his exhaustive report of Elko County, Nevada. He was born in Toronto, Canada, and grew up in Marshalltown, Iowa and Seattle, Washington. He graduated valedictorian of his high school class in Seattle at the age of 16, and attended the University of Washington, where he received both a B.S. and M.S. degree in Geology and Mining (1931 and 1932).  He continued graduate work at the University of California, Berkeley, receiving his doctorate in 1938, with a thesis on the ore bodies of the Virginia City mining district in Nevada.  He was known as an eccentric and brilliant student.

In 1937, Coats took a teaching job at the University of Alaska Fairbanks.  He left that job for a post with the U.S. Geological Survey in 1939, in Washington, D.C.  As part of the Alaska Branch of the USGS, he continued working in Alaska, mapping in the Chichagof, Anikovik, Nome, Solomon, Kigluaik and Kobuk River areas, among others.  During World War II, he spent time in the Aleutian Islands, returning in 1946 as part of the Survey’s Volcano Project.  His field work in the Aleutians led to his 1962 paper (see references) on the origin of the Aleutian island arc. That prescient synthesis of tectonics and magmatism of the Aleutian arc contained several of the essential ideas of the subsequent paradigm of plate tectonics.  He correctly interpreted:
 that the origin of the dipping zone of seismicity beneath the Aleutian arc occurs along a megathrust above underthrusting oceanic crust and its sedimentary cover;
 the relation between the position of the active volcanoes and depth to the underthrust oceanic crust;
 the role of fluids derived from the down-going slab and magmatic differentiation in determining compositions of erupted volcanic rocks (See Figure 1).

Coats’s colleagues from the Alaska Branch of the USGS have commented on his extraordinary ability to comprehend the detailed geologic history of an area with only the most cursory examination. Visiting the Aleutian islands of Buldir, Adak, Kanaga, Semisophochnoi, Gareloi, Kiska and Amchitka (among others), typically for 1–2 days in notoriously bad weather, he produced geologic reports of such detail, insight and quality that they remain today, even in the face of much additional work, the prime source for understanding Aleutian geology.

From 1951 to 1954, Coats was engaged in the search for radioactive granitic rocks, and in field studies of rhyolitic extrusive rocks.  His field work took him to New England, and to all of the western states.  In 1954, he began a long and productive period of work in Elko County, Nevada, where he studied rhyolites, stratigraphy and structure, and mapped the geology of the Jarbidge, Owyhee, Mountain City and Tuscarora 15’ quadrangles.  He relocated to Menlo Park, California in 1956, but spent most summers with his family in a field camp in Nevada.  Many of his 70 publications were based on his work in this period, which culminated in his 1987 synthesis report on the Geology of Elko County, a complex area the size of Connecticut and Massachusetts together.  The 1:250,000 scale map for the report has a total of 109 mapping units, with areas mapped as small as 10 ha.

Although most of his professional career was spent outside of academia, Coats enjoyed mentoring and teaching one-on-one.  Many of his former field assistants and protégés have gone on to illustrious careers in universities and government service.

Coats was married for 58 years to Elizabeth Robinson Coats.  He died peacefully at his home in Aptos, California, on January 12, 1995.  He was survived by two sons (David of Minneapolis and Robert of Berkeley) and a daughter (Katherine Mrache, of Aptos), and seven grandchildren.

Selected publications

References
 
 

1910 births
1995 deaths
20th-century American geologists
Canadian emigrants to the United States
University of Washington alumni
University of California, Berkeley alumni
University of Alaska Fairbanks faculty
People from Marshalltown, Iowa
United States Geological Survey personnel
Scientists from Toronto
People from Aptos, California
Tectonicists